Simira is a genus of plants in the family Rubiaceae. It contains the following species:

Simira alba 
Simira aristeguietae 
Simira cesariana 
Simira colorata 
Simira cordifolia 
Simira corumbensis 
Simira ecuadorensis 
Simira eliezeriana 
Simira erythroxylon 
Simira fragrans 
Simira gardneriana 
Simira goudotii 
Simira grazielae 
Simira hadrantha 
Simira hatschbachiorum 
Simira hexandra 
Simira hirsuta 
Simira ignicola 
Simira klugei 
Simira lezamae 
Simira longifolia 
Simira macrocrater 
Simira maxonii 
Simira mexicana 
Simira mollis 
Simira panamensis 
Simira paraensis 
Simira paraguayensis 
Simira pikia 
Simira pilosa 
Simira podocarpa 
Simira rhodoclada 
Simira robusta 
Simira rubescens 
Simira rubra 
Simira salvadorensis 
Simira sampaioana 
Simira standleyi 
Simira tinctoria 
Simira walteri 
Simira williamsii 
Simira wurdackii

References 

 
Rubiaceae genera
Taxonomy articles created by Polbot